Catedral Evangelica Reformada, originally the Clinton Avenue Reformed Church, is a historic church located at 27 Lincoln Park and Halsey Street in the Lincoln Park neighborhood of Newark in Essex County, New Jersey. It was added to the National Register of Historic Places on October 26, 1972, for its significance in architecture and religion. It was added as a contributing property to the Lincoln Park Historic District on January 5, 1984.

History and description
The church was designed by architect Thomas A. Roberts in Gothic Revival style. It was constructed from 1868 to 1872. Built using light-colored sandstone, it features a tall square turret with a broach spire.

See also 
 National Register of Historic Places listings in Essex County, New Jersey

References

External links
 

Churches in Newark, New Jersey
Churches on the National Register of Historic Places in New Jersey
Gothic Revival church buildings in New Jersey
Churches completed in 1872
19th-century churches in the United States
National Register of Historic Places in Newark, New Jersey
Historic district contributing properties in Newark, New Jersey
Individually listed contributing properties to historic districts on the National Register in New Jersey
New Jersey Register of Historic Places